Pajala Airport is an airport in Pajala, Sweden.

History
The airport was opened for regular traffic in 1999. Before that, Pajala was said to be the most inaccessible municipality centre in Sweden, with around 5 hours travel time from central Stockholm (with propeller flight to Gällivare Airport, hand luggage only, and a 140 km journey by car from Gällivare to Pajala). A political principle was established at the time saying that there should be maximum four hours travel time between central Stockholm and any municipality centre, in order to make one-day business travel possible.

Beginning in December 2013, the airport has been used for several charter flights per year from the United Kingdom for tourists wishing to see a white Christmas.

In 2021 the terminal building was enlarged to allow more passengers and more luggage. The winter flights from UK has had passengers staying only for the day with hand luggage only, but there is a wish to have flights with 200 passengers with checkin luggage staying longer time.

Airlines and destinations

Enter Air operate irregular charters to/from the UK in December.

Statistics

Ground transportation
Taxi and rental cars are available. The bus no 46 Gällivare–Pajala stops at the main road near the airport, however only twice per day.

References

World Aero Data

External links

 

Airports in Sweden
Buildings and structures in Norrbotten County
Airports in the Arctic